Accountor (formerly known as Pretax Group) specialises in software and outsourcing services for financial and HR services. The group employs about 2.300 in six countries. The group’s headquarters are located at Accountor Tower, in the Keilaniemi district of Espoo, Finland. In addition to Finland, the group operates in Sweden, Norway, Denmark, Netherlands and Ukraine.

In Finland, Accountor outsourcing employs over 1000 financial management people and has close to 30 offices all over the country.

References

Accounting firms
Financial services companies of Finland
Business software companies
Business process outsourcing companies
Companies based in Helsinki
Human resource management software
Business services companies established in 1944
1944 establishments in Finland
Finnish brands